Ted Lewis Wilson (born May 18, 1939) is an American politician who served as the 30th mayor of Salt Lake City from 1976 until July 1985. He won three elections. Wilson resigned during his third term to become the director of the Hinckley Institute of Politics at the University of Utah where he held an adjunct assistant professorship of Political Science.

His terms were noted by an election in May, 1979 to change the five member commission form of government to a mayor/council form. This initiative was created by a city scandal involving the take-over of the city personnel department by the chief of police.

Other highlights of Wilson's administration included re-construction of the Salt Lake City International Airport, re-building the city's sewage treatment plant, re-tooling the water system, and expanding the green space of the city's parks department. Wilson also initiated and passed the first historical and foothill preservation ordinances in the city's history. Wilson is the executive director of the Utah Rivers Council, a Utah-based environmental organization.

Early life and education 
Ted Wilson was born May 18, 1939, in Salt Lake City, Utah. He attended schools in Salt Lake City, graduating from South High School in 1957 and from the University of Utah in 1964, with a Bachelor of Science degree in political science. He received a master's degree in Education from the University of Washington in 1969. In 1983, he received an honorary Doctorate of Laws from Westminster College of Salt Lake City.

Career 
From 1957 to 1963, he served in the Utah Army National Guard and was activated to full-time status during the Berlin Crisis. He was an instructor at the Leysin American School, Leysin, Switzerland for one year. He also taught economics at Skyline High School, Salt Lake City, Utah for seven years. During the summer months of 1966 to 1969 he was a mountaineering park ranger in Grand Teton National Park.

He was appointed Chief of Staff to U.S. Congressman Wayne Owens (D-UT) in March 1973. In April 1975 he was appointed to direct the Department of Social Services in Salt Lake County. In November 1975 he was elected as Mayor of Salt Lake City. He served as Mayor until July 1, 1985, when he became the Director of the Hinckley Institute of Politics at the University of Utah. Retiring from the Hinckley Institute in September 2003, Wilson retains status as Professor Emeritus of political science and continues to teach classes at the university. Wilson is a founder of the Exoro Co.

He ran against Orrin Hatch for the Senate in 1982. In 1988, he was the Democratic candidate for Governor of the State of Utah. In 1991, Wilson was selected by the Harvard University John F. Kennedy Institute of Politics as an institute fellow during the Autumn Semester.

Personal travel to India has allowed Wilson to study and understand the Indian system of government. Wilson has made ten trips to India leading university student expeditions. During those visits, he has met with the Dalai Lama, and led efforts to build housing for Tibetan Refugees in Bir, a community hall in Leh, Ladakh and a school in Kotwara.

Wilson loves the sport of mountaineering and has climbed routes in Utah, in the Tetons, and in other ranges including the Alps, Alaska, and the Andes. Wilson has established three climbing schools still in operation and was a climbing ranger in Grand Teton National Park. He guided in the Tetons for Exum Mountain Guides and owned the Jackson Hole Mountain Guides in 1970. He received the Department of the Interior Valor award for a mountain rescue on the North Face of the Grand Teton in 1967.

Wilson is married to former Salt Lake Tribune columnist Holly Mullen. From his previous marriage to Kathryn Carling, Wilson has five children. He is stepfather to Mullen's two children. He is grandfather to 13 grandchildren.

Ted Wilson serves several boards including the Friends of Alta, Governor's Energy Task Force, and is chairman of the Governor's Council on Balanced Resources. He enjoys bicycling, skiing, rock climbing, and backpacking with his family.

Awards and honors 
 National Science Foundation Fellow, University of Washington, 1968–69
 Department of Interior, Valor Award, 1968, for Grand Teton north face rescue
 Utah Bolivian Partners, Fern Wiser Award for Distinguished Service to Bolivian Education, 1976
 Utah National Guard, Bronze Minuteman Award, 1979
 Chairman, Utah Presidential Inaugural Hosting Committee for President Carter, 1977
 Utah League of Cities and Towns Award - Outstanding Utah Elected Municipal Official, 1983
 Honorary Doctorate of Laws, Westminster College of Salt Lake City June, 1984
 Fellow, John F. Kennedy Institute of Politics, Harvard University, 1991
 Pi Sigma Alpha "Professor of the Year," 1994; University of Utah Political Science Department
 Mortar Board National Honor Society "Top Professor Award," 1996
 Professor Emeritus, University of Utah
 Department of Communication, University of Utah, Distinguished Service Award, 2011
 University of Utah Emeritus Alumni Board, Merit of Honor Award, 2012

Publications

Books 
 Utah's Wasatch Front, Utah Geographic Series, 1987
 Utah Then and Now, Westcliffe Publishers, 2000.

Press 
 Numerous articles in The Wasatch Runner and the Utah Business Review Op-Ed articles in Deseret News and Salt Lake Tribune, The Event, "Putting Together the Leadership Puzzle."
 Weekly political column in The Enterprise, a Salt Lake City business newspaper 2000 to 2001
 Weekly political column in The Deseret News, a Salt Lake City daily newspaper, Wilson and Webb 2000–2002.
 Article in Utah Forum, "Professor Productivity: An Emerging Issue in America and Utah," June, 1994.

References

1939 births
American Latter Day Saints
Living people
Mayors of Salt Lake City
University of Utah alumni
University of Utah faculty
Utah Democrats
Harvard Kennedy School people